In the 1940–41 season, USM Alger is competing in the Third Division for the 4th season French colonial era, as well as the Forconi Cup. They will be competing in First Division, and the Coupe de la Ligue.

Competitions

Overview

Championnat

League table

Group B

Matches

Coupe de la Ligue

References

External links
 L'Echo d'Alger : journal républicain du matin

USM Alger seasons
Algerian football clubs 1940–41 season